Parasambus is a genus of beetles in the family Buprestidae, containing the following species:

 Parasambus aurosignatus Descarpentries & Villiers, 1966
 Parasambus sauteri (Kerremans, 1913)

References

Buprestidae genera